Clubroot (born Dan Richmond, c. 1985) is a dubstep musician located in St Albans, England. Signed to Lo Dubs, he released his eponymous debut album in 2009. The second album, II – MMX, was released in 2010. Critics have compared his music to that of Burial, noting that both have a deep, dark electronic sound.

Discography

Albums 
 Clubroot (2009), Lo Dubs
 II – MMX (2010), Lo Dubs
 III – MMXII (2012), Lo Dubs

EPs 

 Solar Flares (2010), Lo Dubs
 Summons (2012), Lo Dubs
 Scars/Hellion (2012), Solace Records
 Surface Tension: I (2020), Lo Dubs
 Surface Tension: II (2020), Lo Dubs
 Surface Tension: III (2020), Lo Dubs
 Surface Tension: IV (2020), Lo Dubs

Singles
"Closure" 
"Dust Storm" 
"Dry Cured" 
"Toe To Toe" 
"Physically"

References

External links
 Clubroot on Myspace
 
 Lo Dubs label

English electronic musicians
English record producers
Dubstep musicians
Future garage musicians
Living people
Musicians from St Albans
1985 births
Musicians from Hertfordshire
Electronic dance music DJs